The Lorry or The Truck is a 1977 French drama film directed by Marguerite Duras.

Reaction
Le camion was entered into the 1977 Cannes Film Festival.

After the Cannes debut, the crowd reacted "at first with highly vocal disbelief and the with outbursts of anger, and walk-outs" and even those "charmed by her harmonious, lulling use of the film medium ... have, buried under a few layers, the rebellious instincts that others [gave] loud voice to."

Following the showing, Duras stood atop a flight of stairs while a crowd yelled insults at her.

In an interview with Marguerite Duras, Jean-Luc Godard praised the film for the way that it "lets the text come through but also carries it."

Cast
 Marguerite Duras as Her
 Gérard Depardieu as Him

References

External links
 

1977 films
1977 drama films
French drama films
1970s French-language films
Films directed by Marguerite Duras
1970s French films